South Ealing Cemetery is a cemetery in South Ealing which was established in 1861 as Ealing and Old Brentford Cemetery. The cemetery covers 21 acres.

The cemetery contains the Commonwealth war graves of 184 armed service personnel, as well as that of a Belgian soldier of World War I.

References

External links
 

1861 establishments in England
Cemeteries in London
Parks and open spaces in the London Borough of Ealing